Bernhard Ebbinghaus (born 2 June 1961) is a German sociologist and comparative social policy expert at the University of Mannheim.

Biography 
Ebbinghaus was born in 1961 in Stuttgart. He studied sociology at the University of Mannheim (1981–88) and was a Fulbright student at the New School for Social Research in 1984/85. Following a year at the Institut Universitaire d'Etudes Européennes in Geneva, he was a doctoral student at the European University Institute (EUI) in Florence, Italy (1989–92), where he wrote his Ph.D. thesis on Labour Unity in Union Diversity: Trade Unions and Social Cleavages in Western Europe, 1890-1989 (1993). Returning to Mannheim, Ebbinghaus taught sociology and coordinated an international research project on trade unions in Europe at the Mannheim Centre for European Social Research (MZES). From 1997 until 2004, he was Senior Fellow at the Max Planck Institute for the Study of Societies (MPIfG) in Cologne and completed his Habilitation thesis in sociology at the University of Cologne in 2003. He was John F. Kennedy Memorial Fellow at the Center for European Studies at Harvard University (1999/2000), Visiting Professor at the University of Wisconsin in Madison (fall 2001), and Interim Professor at the University of Jena, Germany (2003–04). Ebbinghaus was Professor of Sociology (Chair of Macrosociology) at the University of Mannheim from 2004 until 2016, where he was founding director of the Doctoral Center for the Social and Behavioral Studies of the Graduate School of Economic and Social Sciences (GESS) (2006–09). Most recently, he was Director of the Mannheim Centre for European Social Research (MZES) (2008–11), one of the largest university-based social science research institutes in Germany. From 2017 until 2021 Ebbinghaus was Professor of Social Policy, Head of the Department of Social Policy and Intervention and Fellow of Green Templeton College at the University of Oxford. Ebbingaus returned to the Chair of Macrosociology at University of Mannheim in 2022. He is a specialist of comparative social policy, analyzing the reform processes of welfare states in Europe and other OECD countries. Since November 2021 Professor Ebbinghaus is member of the European Commission’s High-Level Group on the future of social protection and of the welfare state in the EU.

Book publications 

 with J. Timo Weishaupt, eds.The Role of Social Partners in Managing Europe’s Great Recession: Crisis Corporatism or Corporatism in Crisis?. Abingdon, UK: Routledge, 2021
 with Elias Naumann, eds.Welfare State Reforms Seen from Below. Comparing Public Attitudes and Organized Interests in Britain and Germany, London, UK: Palgrave Macmillan / Cham, Switzerland: Springer Online, 2018. 
 ed. The Varieties of Pension Governance. Pension Privatization in Europe. Oxford, UK: Oxford University Press, 2011. 
 Reforming Early Retirement in Europe, Japan and the USA. Oxford, UK: Oxford University Press, 2006. 
 with Philip Manow, eds., Comparing Welfare Capitalism: Social Policy and Political Economy in Europe, Japan and the USA. London, UK: Routledge, 2001.
 with Jelle Visser: Trade Unions in Western Europe since 1945. London, UK: Palgrave-Macmillan, 2000.

References

External links 
 http://ebbinghaus.blog
 https://www.sowi.uni-mannheim.de/en/ebbinghaus/
 http://www.spi.ox.ac.uk
 https://web.archive.org/web/20110820081324/http://lssoz3.sowi.uni-mannheim.de/english/startpage/index.html
 https://scholar.google.de/citations?user=3ppVQCMAAAAJ&hl=en
 http://www.mzes.uni-mannheim.de/homepage_e.html

Writers from Stuttgart
German sociologists
Living people
1961 births
German male writers
Academic staff of the University of Mannheim
Fellows of Green Templeton College, Oxford